Mount Kenton Cemetery is a small cemetery in the rural city of Paducah, Kentucky in the United States of America. It is located approximately four miles south of Paducah. The area of the cemetery was original deeded by Joseph Kenton to Charles A. Campbell, Hiram Hall, J.D. Brandberry, T.P. Reynolds, and a Church of the Old School Presbyterians for a church to be placed there. 

Among those buried at Mount Kenton is Alben W. Barkley (1877–1956), 35th vice president of the United States under Harry S. Truman.

References

Cemeteries